LSS, also known as Last Song Syndrome, is a 2019 Filipino musical romantic drama film written and directed by Jade Castro, and starring Gabbi Garcia, Khalil Ramos, Tuesday Vargas, and Filipino folk-pop band Ben&Ben. It had a theatrical release in the Philippines on September 13, 2019, as one of the entries of the 2019 Pista ng Pelikulang Pilipino.

Plot
Aspiring musician Sarah and hopeless romantic Zack find themselves in the most unfortunate situations in their separate lives. Struggling to navigate through life, they both unexpectedly found a common bond for their love of music and being fans of Ben&Ben coincidentally. After a series of events and unexpected encounters with each other, will that love for the 9-piece Filipino folk-pop band eventually bring and mend their broken hearts together?

Cast

Soundtrack
Ten original songs were featured in the film, namely "Ride Home," "Branches," "Leaves," "Kathang Isip," "Bibingka," "Fall," "Maybe The Night," "Mitsa (Salamat)," "Araw-Araw," and "Pagtingin" which are all performed by Ben&Ben. For these songs, Ben&Ben received positive responses, with "Araw-Araw" winning Best Original Song at Pista ng Pelikulang Pilipino Awards.

Release
The film was one of the first 3 films the Film Development Council of the Philippines (FDCP) announced to be official entries for the 3rd Pista ng Pelikulang Pilipino, where it premiered on September 13, 2019.

The film was also available for streaming on November 29, 2019, on iflix. The film was screened on March 8 & 10, 2020 as an official entry under New Action! Southeast Asia category in the 15th Osaka Asian Film Festival in Osaka, Japan.

Accolades

References

External links
 
 
 LSS in Globe Studios

Philippine romantic drama films
2019 films
Filipino-language films
2019 romantic drama films
2010s musical films
Films directed by Jade Castro